Where's the Dragon? is a 2015 3D animated comedy film directed by Foo Sing-Choong, co-directed by Betty Tang. A China-Hong Kong co-production, the film was released in China on October 23, 2015.

Voice cast
Zhang Ziyi
Wang Leehom
Michael Wong
Maggie Chiang
Fish Leong
Leon Dai

Reception
The film has earned  at the Chinese box office.

References

2015 comedy films
2015 3D films
2015 animated films
2015 films
Animated comedy films
Chinese 3D films
Chinese animated films
Hong Kong 3D films
Hong Kong animated films
Hong Kong comedy films
3D animated films
2010s Hong Kong films